In Greek mythology, Sithon ( or ; Ancient Greek: Σίθων) was a king of the Odomanti or Hadomanti in Thrace, and presumably the eponym of the peninsula Sithonia and the tribe Sithones.

Family 
Sithon was the son of either Poseidon and Ossa or of Ares and Anchiroe. He was married to the nymph Mendeis, though Anchiroe is otherwise also given as his wife rather than mother, and had at least two daughters: Rhoeteia, eponym of the promontory of Rhoetium in the Troad, and Pallene. One source gives him as the father of the Thracian princess Phyllis, who loved Demophon of Athens.

Mythology 
Sithon promised both the hand of Pallene and his kingdom to the one who would defeat him in single combat. Pallene was so beautiful that a lot of suitors sought her hand, but all of them, including Merops of Anthemusia and Periphetes of Mygdonia, were slain by Sithon. As he grew older and his strength began to fail him, he arranged that the suitors fight each other instead of himself until one of them was killed; the winner would then get both Pallene and the kingdom. When two new wooers, Dryas and Cleitus, arrived, Pallene fell in love with Cleitus. Out of fear for him, she cried so much that her old tutor realized what her feelings were and decided to help. As the suitors were supposed to fight on chariots, he bribed Dryas' charioteer so that he left undone the pins of the chariot wheels. So when Dryas attacked, the wheels came off and he fell to the ground, and was defeated and killed by Cleitus with ease. Sithon became aware of the stratagem and was outraged so much that he intended to slay his daughter next to Dryas' funeral pyre. But the girl was saved by Aphrodite, who appeared at night in front of the inhabitants of the country; alternatively, a sudden heavy shower was sent down by the gods, making Sithon change his mind. He married Pallene to Cleitus; after his death they inherited the kingdom, and the country as well as a city in Thrace subsequently received the name of Pallene.

A different story of Sithon and Pallene is found in Nonnus' Dionysiaca. According to it, Sithon was in love with his own daughter, and that was the reason why he was killing her wooers one after another. This lasted until one day Dionysus came and suggested that he would fight for Pallene's hand with the maiden herself. Sithon agreed, and Dionysus wrestled with Pallene in a manner that was more like seducing her. Sithon interrupted and pronounced the god winner; Dionysus then killed the king with his thyrsus, thus avenging the deaths of the previous suitors. He consorted with Pallene, although he stayed with her for but a night.

The myths of Sithon, Pallene and the suitors are similar to those of Oenomaus, Hippodamia and Pelops.

This Sithon might be the Sithon that according to Ovid in the Metamorphoses "became of indeterminate sex, now man, now woman".

Notes

References 

 Conon, Fifty Narrations, surviving as one-paragraph summaries in the Bibliotheca (Library) of Photius, Patriarch of Constantinople translated from the Greek by Brady Kiesling. Online version at the Topos Text Project.
 Maurus Servius Honoratus, In Vergilii carmina comentarii. Servii Grammatici qui feruntur in Vergilii carmina commentarii; recensuerunt Georgius Thilo et Hermannus Hagen. Georgius Thilo. Leipzig. B. G. Teubner. 1881. Online version at the Perseus Digital Library.
 Nonnus of Panopolis, Dionysiaca translated by William Henry Denham Rouse (1863-1950), from the Loeb Classical Library, Cambridge, MA, Harvard University Press, 1940.  Online version at the Topos Text Project.
 Nonnus of Panopolis, Dionysiaca. 3 Vols. W.H.D. Rouse. Cambridge, MA., Harvard University Press; London, William Heinemann, Ltd. 1940–1942. Greek text available at the Perseus Digital Library.
 Parthenius, Love Romances translated by Sir Stephen Gaselee (1882-1943), S. Loeb Classical Library Volume 69. Cambridge, MA. Harvard University Press. 1916.  Online version at the Topos Text Project.
 Parthenius, Erotici Scriptores Graeci, Vol. 1. Rudolf Hercher. in aedibus B. G. Teubneri. Leipzig. 1858. Greek text available at the Perseus Digital Library.
 Stephanus of Byzantium, Stephani Byzantii Ethnicorum quae supersunt, edited by August Meineike (1790-1870), published 1849. A few entries from this important ancient handbook of place names have been translated by Brady Kiesling. Online version at the Topos Text Project.

Children of Ares
Children of Poseidon
Mythological kings of Thrace
Kings in Greek mythology
Greek mythology of Thrace
Metamorphoses into the opposite sex in Greek mythology